The Queensland 500 was a motorsport endurance race held at Queensland Raceway near Ipswich, Queensland, Australia. It was best known as a V8 Supercars race held from 1999 to 2002. It was also very famous for The Ford AU Falcon taking two of its most famous victories in 2001 and 2002.

History

Background
The Queensland 500 was launched by the V8 Supercars category in 1999 to replace the Sandown 500 as the two-driver endurance event in the build-up to the Bathurst 1000. Supported by the Queensland Government, it was held at the newly built Queensland Raceway. The Queensland 500 also counted for championship points, with both the 500 kilometre race and the Bathurst 1000 added to the championship in 1999 for the first time. In 1999 and 2000, Queensland Raceway hosted both the endurance event and a sprint round of the championship.

V8 Supercars
The first event in 1999 was won by Larry Perkins and Russell Ingall, who were defending champions of the 500 km event, having won the 1998 Tickford 500 at Sandown. The race proved crucial in the 1999 championship. Rather than pairing them together, the Holden Racing Team decided to split their two full-time drivers, Mark Skaife and Craig Lowndes, in the two-driver endurance races as they were both in championship contention. After Skaife suffered accident damage in an incident with Jason Bright, he could only finish 22nd, giving team-mate and eventual champion Lowndes a large points advantage with a third-place finish. In 2000, Holden Racing Team team-mates Skaife and Lowndes combined to win, this time helping Skaife in his successful championship campaign.

2001 saw a dramatic finish to the race due to a torrential rain shower. As the rain increased in the final five laps, Paul Radisich spun into a gravel trap out of the lead, giving the lead to the Perkins and Ingall entry. However, soon after, a red flag was waved, and as per the regulations the results were finalised as the standings on the second to last completed lap, meaning Radisich, driving with Steven Johnson, was still credited with the race win despite being beached in the gravel trap. 2002 saw a surprise victory in the form of David Besnard and Simon Wills, the only round win of both of their championship careers. The pair had only taken the lead on the penultimate lap when Greg Murphy ran low on fuel. The win was Ford's first round win since the Queensland 500 twelve months prior, while eventual seven-times champion Jamie Whincup also made his debut in the race.

Demise
After the collapse of original circuit owners, Motorsport Queensland took control. Their interest in the race waned and the race reverted to the status of a standard V8 Supercar sprint round from 2003. This sprint event continues to this day. The 500 km race returned to Sandown Raceway for 2003.

Revival
The race was revived from 2006 to 2008 as a GT, sportscar and touring car relay race. The Queensland 500 was run for the final time in 2008.

Winners

Notes
  – Race was red flagged due to bad weather; results were declared as of lap 156.''

Sponsors
 2000: OzEmail
 2001–02: VIP Petfoods
 2008: Porsche Centre Gold Coast

See also
 Ipswich Super Sprint
 Sandown 500
 Phillip Island 500
 List of Australian Touring Car Championship races

References

 
Recurring sporting events established in 1999
Supercars Championship races
Touring car races
Auto races in Australia
1999 establishments in Australia
Recurring sporting events disestablished in 2002
2002 disestablishments in Australia